Jones Peak is a mainly ice-free peak,  high, standing  west-northwest of Mount Fisher at the head of DeGanahl Glacier, in the Prince Olav Mountains of Antarctica. It was named by the Advisory Committee on Antarctic Names for John M. Jones, Program Officer of the Committee on Polar Research, National Academy of Sciences, 1957–1963.

References

Dufek Coast
Mountains of the Ross Dependency
Queen Maud Mountains